The Forests and Forest Flora of the Colony of the Cape of Good Hope, is a botanical reference book written and illustrated by Thomas Robertson Sim, and published in 1907 by Taylor & Henderson of Aberdeen. At the time he was the Conservator of Forests of Natal, and had been the District Forest Officer in King William's Town, bringing a wealth of experience to the creation of this monumental work. Sim had previously written a great many books such as "Handbook of Kaffrarian Ferns", "The Ferns of South Africa" and "Botanical Observations on the Forests of Eastern Pondoland". He was a Fellow of both the Linnaean Society and the Royal Horticultural Society, with sterling credentials for producing this extensive flora of the Cape.

Format and Content
The book is of large quarto format (240mm x 300mm) and consists of 365 pages of text followed by 160 plates of line drawings by the author. Chapters are as follows:

Botany books
1907 books
Florae (publication)